Camillo Siciliano di Rende, sometimes Siciliano di Rende (9 June 1847 – 16 May 1897) was an Italian prelate of the Catholic Church who was Archbishop of Benevento from 1879 until his death in 1897. He was also Bishop of Tricarico from 1877 to 1879 and Apostolic Nuncio to France from 1882 to 1887. He was made a cardinal in 1887.

Biography
Camillo Siciliano di Rende was born in Naples on 9 June 1847 into a noble family, the son of the Marquis Giovanni di Rende. The family name was "Siciliano" and its title "di Rende". After beginning his studies in Piedigrotta, he joined his parents as they accompanied the Bourbons of Naples into exile in 1860. He studied humanities at the minor seminary of La Chapelle-Saint-Mesmin near Orléans. From 1867 to 1868 he earned a licentiate in philosophy at the Pontifical Gregorian University and then studied theology at Collegio Capranica.

He was ordained a priest of the Archdiocese of Naples on 3 June 1871. He was pastor of a parish in London for several months and then returned to Naples where he devoted himself to preaching to French and English pilgrims and converting Protestants.

Pope Pius IX appointed him bishop of Tricarico on 28 December 1877. He received his episcopal consecration on 1 January 1878 from Cardinal Flavio Chigi. Pope Leo XIII made him a member of the papal nobility as Assistant to the Pontifical Throne on 20 August 1878. He was appointed Archbishop of Benevento on 12 May 1879.

He was named Apostolic Nuncio to France on 26 October 1882, but Pope Leo granted his request to retain the see of Benevento, to which he eventually returned. When made a cardinal, he remained in Paris as pro-nuncio until the appointment of his successor.

Pope Leo raised him to the rank of cardinal priest on 14 March 1887. He received his red biretta and was assigned the titular church of San Sisto on 26 May 1887. He was not quite forty years old and the youngest member of the College of Cardinals.

He died suddenly of pneumonia on 16 May 1897 at the abbey of Montecassino, where he had stopped en route to Rome where he planned to attend the canonization ceremony for Anthony Zaccaria.

Notes

References

External links
 
 

1847 births
1897 deaths
People from Naples
Apostolic Nuncios to France
19th-century Roman Catholic bishops in Ireland
Archbishops of Benevento
Cardinals created by Pope Leo XIII